The 1969 Championship of Australia was the 13th edition of the Championship of Australia, an ANFC-organised national club Australian rules football match between the champion clubs from the VFL and the SANFL.

Qualified Teams

Venue
 Adelaide Oval (Capacity: 64,000)

Match Details

Championship of Australia

References 

Championship of Australia
Australian rules football competitions in Australia
1969 in Australian rules football
October 1969 sports events in Australia